Flemington is a town in Taylor County, West Virginia, United States. The population was 311 at the 2020 census. Flemington was incorporated in 1922 by the West Virginia Circuit Court, and named for James Fleming, an early settler in the area originally from Hampshire County.

Geography
Flemington is located at  (39.266749, -80.129378), along Simpson Creek.

Demographics

2010 census
As of the census of 2010, there were 312 people, 124 households, and 90 families living in the town. The racial makeup of the town was 98.7% White, 0.6% African American, and 0.6% from two or more races. Hispanic or Latino of any race were 2.6% of the population.

There were 124 households, of which 29.0% had children under the age of 18 living with them, 50.0% were married couples living together, 12.1% had a female householder with no husband present, 10.5% had a male householder with no wife present, and 27.4% were non-families. 23.4% of all households were made up of individuals, and 13.7% had someone living alone who was 65 years of age or older. The average household size was 2.52 and the average family size was 2.94.

The median age in the town was 45 years. 21.8% of residents were under the age of 18; 6.1% were between the ages of 18 and 24; 22.1% were from 25 to 44; 29.1% were from 45 to 64; and 20.8% were 65 years of age or older. The gender makeup of the town was 49.4% male and 50.6% female.

2000 census
As of the census of 2000, there were 287 people, 108 households, and 77 families living in the town. The population density was 943.5 inhabitants per square mile (369.4/km2). There were 117 housing units at an average density of 384.7 per square mile (150.6/km2). The racial makeup of the town was 98.26% White, 1.05% African American, 0.35% Native American, and 0.35% from two or more races. Hispanic or Latino of any race were 2.44% of the population.

There were 108 households, out of which 29.6% had children under the age of 18 living with them, 58.3% were married couples living together, 8.3% had a female householder with no husband present, and 28.7% were non-families. 24.1% of all households were made up of individuals, and 14.8% had someone living alone who was 65 years of age or older. The average household size was 2.66 and the average family size was 3.19.

In the town, the population was spread out, with 23.7% under the age of 18, 5.9% from 18 to 24, 27.9% from 25 to 44, 27.5% from 45 to 64, and 15.0% who were 65 years of age or older. The median age was 40 years. For every 100 females, there were 108.0 males. For every 100 females age 18 and over, there were 93.8 males.

The median income for a household in the town was $27,917, and the median income for a family was $40,417. Males had a median income of $32,500 versus $21,563 for females. The per capita income for the town was $12,540. About 22.7% of families and 23.6% of the population were below the poverty line, including 24.1% of those under the age of eighteen and 10.5% of those 65 or over.

References

External links
 Flemington Elementary School

Towns in Taylor County, West Virginia
Towns in West Virginia
Clarksburg micropolitan area
Coal towns in West Virginia